Les Inouk de Granby are a Canadian Junior ice hockey team from Granby, Quebec, Canada.  They are a part of the Quebec Junior Hockey League.

History
The Frontaliers were Quebec champions in 1998 and 2000.

Season-by-season record
Note: GP = Games Played, W = Wins, L = Losses, T = Ties, OTL = Overtime Losses, GF = Goals for, GA = Goals against

Fred Page Cup
Eastern Canada Championships
MHL - QAAAJHL - CCHL - Host
Round robin play with 2nd vs 3rd in semi-final to advance against 1st in the finals.

External links
Inouk Webpage

Sport in Granby, Quebec
Ligue de Hockey Junior AAA Quebec teams